27th Street may refer to:
27th Street Historic District, Los Angeles, California
27th Street station, a railway station in  Chicago, Illinois
27th Street, Manhattan, New York, New York

See also
Church and 27th Street, San Francisco, California